Instituto Tecnológico de Ciudad Madero is a technological institute in Ciudad Madero, Tamaulipas, Mexico. Commonly abbreviated as ITCM. ITCM is part of the Mexican public education system (SEP) and offers several careers mainly related to the industrial needs of the region.

History
The first stone of the institution was placed on November 20, 1950. Its educational activities started in 1954 offering technical courses. Its first director was Mr. Luis Hidalgo y Castro.

In 1956 he started undergraduate programs in Chemical Engineering, Electrical and Mechanical.

Its current director (since January 2011) is Mr. Arnulfo Hernandez Hector Enriquez.

Technological Institute of Ciudad Madero

The Constitution of a Board pro-construction of the School of Arts and Crafts was the first step that gave rise to what in the beginning was the Regional Technological Institute of Ciudad Madero.

On November 20, 1950, the then Director of PEMEX, Mr. Antonio J. Bermudez, representing the President of the Republic, Mr. Miguel German Valdes, laid the cornerstone of the institute. Shortly after the September 2, 1954 courses began at 7:00 am with a total of 511 students serving Chief Engineer Luis Hidalgo y Castro.

The educational programs offered to initiate functions were:

Technical Preparation

 Qualified Workers in Machinery and Tools
 Electrical Repairers
 Welders Oxyacetylene and Arc
 Carpenters, Joiners

RAMA subprofessional

 Mechanical Technician
 Electrician
 Technical Oil Well Driller

Vocational School

 Mechanical
 Electrical
 Chemistry
 Civil
 Architecture

In September 1956 undergraduate careers started with the specialties of Chemical Engineering, Mechanical Engineering and Electrical Engineering. In 1957 it joined the Technical High School. A year later in 1958, offering the specialty of Internal Combustion Technician and by 1961 began in Industrial Engineering.

The Electronics Technician specialty started in 1968, while the worker started in 1972. In 1974 joined their curricula Open Education System at two levels. The educational offer was extended in 1975 with new subjects, Engineering, Geological Engineering and Geophysics.

Accelerated regional development motivated by the year 1976, the Graduate Programs begin with the Master in Management Systems and a Masters in Petroleum and Petrochemical Technology.

1986 was important in the growth of the institution for bachelor level degrees in Electronic Engineering and Computer Systems Engineering Graduate level and start the Master of Science in Electrical Engineering, a Masters in Mathematics Education (through an agreement with CINVESTAV) also is offered for the first time beginning with Petrochemical Ph.D., whose program was born from the continued growth of this industry in the area. Also in these specialties are signed cooperation agreements with the Mexican Petroleum Institute (IMP) and the International Cooperation Agency of Japan (JICA).

In 1993 he began the career of Engineering Geoscience, settling of Engineering Geology and Geophysics. That same year, 1993, offer the Master of Science in Engineering Management. In 1995 the Bachelor in Computer Science started. In 1996 the Master of Science in Chemical Engineering began as a response to changing national trends with respect to oil development. This change also resulted from the recommendations of the Evaluation Committee of the National Register of Graduate CONACYT. That same year, the PhD in Chemical Engineering Petrochemical replacing.

In August 2000 began the Master of Science in Computer Science and six years later was registered in the National Register of CONACYT Graduate with a Master of Science in Chemical Engineering which places them among the best graduate programs in these disciplines.

In 2001 starts the Masters in Administrative Management (replacing the Master of Science in Engineering Management). By 2006 the program starts the race of Environmental Engineering and in 2008 another Graduate with a Masters in Electrical Engineering to replace the Master of Science in Electrical Engineering. And as a result of an investigation of educational provision in our suburbs, authorized the deployment of the most recent race at the institution in August 2010 that starts the Engineering Program in Business Management

All this historical record has forged a solid institution, prestige, based on the needs of organizations and the result is that the Technological Institute of Ciudad Madero and is considered one of the leading research centers in the country.

Academic programs

It offers degrees in:
 Environmental Engineering
 Industrial Engineering
 Electrical Engineering
 Electronic Engineering
 Engineering Geoscience
 Engineering Business Management
 Mechanical Engineering
 Chemical Engineering
 Computer Systems Engineering
 Degree in Computer
At the undergraduate level it serves an average of 8000 students.

At graduate level offers three master's programs and two PhD programs:
 M.C. in Computer Science
 M. Administrative Management
 M.C. in Electrical Engineering
 M.C. in Chemical Engineering
 Doctorate of Science in Chemical Engineering
 Ph.D. in Computer Science.
The latter two programs are enrolled in the National Graduate Padron CONACYT SEP. It also offers a Master of Administrative Management profession-type and a Doctorate of Science in Chemical Engineering. The average population is 293 graduate students.

External links
Official Website Including address and career information.

Universities and colleges in Tamaulipas
Technical universities and colleges in Mexico